Al-Sufiya Sport Club, is an Iraqi football team based in Al-Anbar, that plays in the Iraq Division Two.

Managerial history
 Ahmed Judea

See also 
 2020–21 Iraq FA Cup

References

External links
 Al-Sufiya SC on Goalzz.com
 Iraq Clubs- Foundation Dates

Football clubs in Al-Anbar